Dennis Ray Rehberg (born October 5, 1955) is an American politician and member of the Republican Party. Rehberg was the Republican nominee for the United States Senate in 1996 and 2012, losing to Democratic incumbents Max Baucus 50% to 45% and Jon Tester 49% to 45%, respectively. He subsequently became a co-chairman at Mercury, a Washington D.C. lobbying firm.

Early life, education, and ranching career 
Rehberg was born in Billings, Montana, the son of Patricia Rae (née Cooley) and Jack Dennis Rehberg. His ancestry includes German, Irish, and Scottish. He attended Billings West High School and Montana State University before transferring to Washington State University where he earned his Bachelor of Arts in public administration.

From 1996 to 2001, Rehberg managed the Rehberg Ranch near Billings. He oversaw a herd of 500 cattle and 600 cashmere goats. After being elected to congress, Rehberg gave up ranching, citing the difficulty of managing a herd whilst travelling between Montana and Washington D.C.

Early political career

Staffer 
In 1977 he began working as an intern in the Montana State Senate, and two years later he joined the Washington, D.C. staff of Montana U.S. Congressman Ron Marlenee as a legislative assistant. In 1982, Rehberg returned to farming, until running for the State House in 1984.

Montana legislature 
Rehberg was elected then to the Montana State House of Representatives from 1985 to 1991, where he served three terms. In the legislature, he considered himself to be a fiscal conservative, and he advocated balancing the state budget without any tax increases. He was the only freshman member to serve on the House Appropriations Committee.

Lieutenant Governor 
In July 1991, Rehberg was appointed Lieutenant Governor by Governor Stan Stephens. He was subsequently elected to a full term in 1992.

As Lieutenant Governor, Rehberg sought to bring government back to the local level by traveling to all 56 counties every year. He chaired the Drought Advisory Committee and the Task Force credited with reforming Worker's Compensation, the Montana Rural Development Council, and several health care initiatives. He was succeeded as Lieutenant Governor by fellow Republican Judy Martz.

1996 U.S. Senate election 

He ran for a seat in the United States Senate against incumbent Democratic U.S. Senator Max Baucus, but lost, 50%–45%.

U.S. House of Representatives

Elections 
2000

Incumbent Republican U.S. Congressman Rick Hill of Montana's At-large congressional district decided to retire after two terms in 2000. Rehberg decided to run and won the Republican primary with 74% of the vote. In the general election, he defeated Democratic State School Superintendent Nancy Keenan 52%–46%.

2002

He won re-election to a second term with 65%, against Steven Dickman Kelly.

2004

He won re-election against Tracy Velazquez to a third term with 64%.

2006

He won re-election to a fourth term against Democratic State Representative Monica Lindeen 59%–39%.

2008

He won re-election to a fifth term against Democratic State Representative John Driscoll 64%–32%.

2010

He won re-election to a sixth term against Democrat Dennis McDonald 60%–33%.

Tenure 
National Security and Federal Lands Protection Act (H.R. 1505)
In 2012 Rehberg co-sponsored H.R. 1505, which would waive environmental laws that would otherwise prevent the Department of Homeland Security from constructing roads, fences, and forward operating bases in national parks and wilderness areas within 100 miles of the international border. Homeland Security would not have to inform affected parties before pursuing these activities. The bill's dissenters claim that it "employs a manufactured conflict with border security to weaken [environmental laws]." The Department of Homeland Security called the bill "unnecessary and bad policy" since DHS already has a memorandum of understanding allowing them to enter these lands without prior approval.

Economic record
On April 15, 2011, Rehberg was one of four Republican members of Congress to vote against The Path to Prosperity.

Pell grants and school lunches
After having scrutinized the Pell Grant program as one that was 'expanding' too quickly, congressman Rehberg set his sights on the free school lunch program as a program where there was potential of taxpayers being ripped off, although the state Superintendent of Public Instruction Denise Juneau expressed the real concern that not enough families that qualify request the assistance.

Iraq War
Rehberg voted for the Authorization for Use of Military Force Against Iraq Resolution of 2002.

Rehberg served on the Military Quality of Life and Foreign Operations Subcommittees of the powerful House Committee on Appropriations. In 2007, he voted against the Mandatory Troop Rest Periods between Deployments to Iraq bill (creates a mandatory rest period between deployments to Iraq for members of the Armed Forces, passed) and against the Redeployment from Iraq Act (reduces the presence of the U.S. armed forces in Iraq by April 1, 2008, passed).

Environmental record
Rehberg describes himself as "a lifelong steward of the land".  He voted against the Renewable Energy and Energy Conservation Tax Act of 2007 and against the Securing America's Future Energy (SAFE) Act of 2001. He is currently one of the foremost critics on keeping the gray wolf on the endangered species list.
On environmental issues, Rehberg has also been given low ratings by interest groups. Environment America gave him an 8% rating in 2008, and 27% rating in 2009. Defenders of Wildlife Action Fund gave him a 13% rating. In his position statement on Economic Development, he said "Our [Montana's] coal and natural gas reserves stretch for hundreds of years into the future, and we can turn them into much needed energy." 
Dennis Rehberg states opposition to the Shays-Meehan bill from 1998, of which he says it "stripped freedom of speech rights from Montana citizens." Aside from the bill, he makes a point to say he supports full and open disclosure laws for campaign finance reform.

LGBT issues
Rehberg opposes same-sex marriage, and supports a constitutional amendment defining marriage as between one man and one woman. He voted against the Local Law Enforcement Hate Crimes Prevention Act of 2007, a bill that amends the Federal definition of a hate crime to include gender identity and sexual orientation. The bill passed, 237 to 180. In the Dec. 26, 1994, issue of Newsweek, p. 83, then Lt. Governor Rehberg was quoted as saying, "The problem with AIDS is: you got it, you die. So why are we spending money on the issue?" when discussing cuts to the state's hospital budget.

Committee assignments
112th Congress (2011-2012)
 Committee on Appropriations

111th Congress (2009-2010)
 Committee on Appropriations
 Subcommittee on Energy and Water Development
 Subcommittee on Labor, Health and Human Services, Education, and Related Agencies (Chairman)
 Subcommittee on the Legislative Branch

110th Congress (2007–2008)
 House Committee on Appropriations
 Subcommittee on House Committee on House Committee on Financial Services and General Government
 Subcommittee on Labor, Health and Human Services, and Education

109th Congress (2005–2006)
 House Committee on Appropriations
 Subcommittee on Energy and Water Development and Related Agencies -
 Subcommittee on Foreign Operations Export Financing and Related Programs
 Subcommittee on Military Quality of Life and Veterans Affairs and Related Agencies

Caucus memberships 
 Congressional Rural Caucus
 Co-Chair, Small Brewers Caucus
 Co-Chair, Congressional Baby Caucus
 Co-Chair, Northern Border Caucus
 Former Chair, Drought Advisory Committee
 Firefighter Caucus
 Forest Caucus
 House Vice Chair, Lewis and Clark Bicentennial Congressional Caucus
 Liberty Caucus
 Northwest Energy Caucus
 Republican Study Committee
 Tea Party Caucus
 Sportsmen's Caucus
 Western Caucus
 International Conservation Caucus

2012 U.S. Senate election 

On February 6, 2011, Rehberg announced that he would challenge Senator Jon Tester (D-MT) in 2012. The outcome of the race was expected to have a significant impact on which party controlled the United States Senate during the 113th Congress.

According to Salon, it was a "race that pundits are saying could be a tough challenge for Tester."  Political scientist Larry Sabato predicted a narrow Rehberg victory, pointing out that Rehberg had led in 10 of 13 recent polls. However, Tester eventually defeated Rehberg, 48.7%–44.8%.

2014 U.S. House election 
When after one term in the U.S. House Steve Daines ran for the U.S. Senate, Rehberg considered running for his old House seat, but ultimately declined. The seat was ultimately won by Republican Ryan Zinke.

Personal life 
Rehberg married his high school sweetheart, Jan, a water attorney who represents farmers and ranchers. They have been married for over 25 years and have three children, A.J., Katie, and Elsie.

Wealth 
With a net worth of between $6.5 and $54 million, Rehberg was the fourteenth-richest U.S. Representative in the House in 2008. In an April 2011 town hall meeting video released by the Montana Democratic Party, he told an audience member that he was "land-rich and cash-poor" and "struggling like everyone else."

Lawsuit against the City of Billings 
In July 2010, Rehberg's corporation that has developed a subdivision on his former ranch land sued the City of Billings for calling back firefighters from protecting trees and some scrub brush.  The City of Billings had recently annexed a significant amount of undeveloped grass-land, including Rehberg's ranch, and had not developed a firefighting policy for wildfires, which are significantly different from structure fires. When the fire flared again, the city firefighters had to return to put out the fire after significant damage was done. While the suit was filed in July, Rehberg and his wife did not push forward with litigation, given the political pressures of the 2010 Congressional campaign.

The city of Billings spent nearly $21,000 defending itself against the lawsuit before it was dropped by Rehberg.

Memberships 

 Member, Billings Chamber of Commerce
 Member, Billings Downtown Rotary Club
 Former Chair, Montana Rural Development Council
 Member, Montana Stockgrowers Association
 State Chair, Muscular Dystrophy Association
 National Guard and Reserve Components Congressional Members Organization.

Electoral history

References

External links 
 Congressman Denny Rehberg official U.S. House website
 
 
 

|-

|-

|-

|-

1955 births
20th-century American politicians
21st-century American politicians
American Episcopalians
American people of German descent
American people of Irish descent
American people of Scottish descent
Ranchers from Montana
Candidates in the 1996 United States elections
Candidates in the 2012 United States elections
Living people
Republican Party members of the Montana House of Representatives
Montana State University alumni
Politicians from Billings, Montana
Republican Party members of the United States House of Representatives from Montana
Tea Party movement activists
United States congressional aides
Washington State University alumni
Members of Congress who became lobbyists